Unsorted  is an Indian romance drama television series premiered on 27 January 2023 and digitally streamed on Disney+ Hotstar. Produced under Natak Pictures, it stars Mugdha Agarwal, Vikram Bhui and Tanya Singh Bhatnagar.

Cast
 Mugdha Agarwal as Tara
 Vikram Bhui as Naman
 Tanya Singh Bhatnagar as Seher

Production
The series was announced on Disney+ Hotstar consisting of three episodes. Mugdha Agarwal, Vikram Bhui and Tanya Singh Bhatnagar were cast to appear in the series.

Episodes

Reception

References

External links
 Unsorted on Disney+ Hotstar

 

2023 Indian television series debuts
2020s Indian television series
Indian anthology television series